Daminilidae is an extinct family of fossil sea snails, true limpets, marine gastropod mollusks in the clade Patellogastropoda. This family has no subfamilies.

Taxonomy 
Daminilidae belongs to superfamily Neolepetopsoidea according to the taxonomy of the Gastropoda by Bouchet & Rocroi, 2005).

Neolepetopsoidea was synonymized with Lottioidea so Daminilidae was moved to superfamily Lottioidea in World Register of Marine Species.

References